KMSC may refer to:

 KMSC (AM), a Part-15 unlicensed AM radio station in Moorhead, Minnesota, United States
 KMSC (FM), a radio station (88.3 FM) licensed to Sioux City, Iowa, United States